Although an antique tool might be said to be one that is more than a hundred years old, the term is often used to describe any old tool of quality that might be deemed collectable.

The use of tools is one of the primary means by which humans are distinguished from other animals. Tools are the parents of all other antiques. Most man-made objects were made and great effort goes into the creation of newer and better tools to solve the production problems of today. The study of antique tools provides a glimpse of human development and cultural preferences history.

The creation of a tool often makes possible the creation of more advanced tools. Advanced tools made possible the manufacture of internal-combustion engines, automobiles, and computers. Among those who like to collect, some may do so as part of a rigorous study program they want to catalog all types of a specific tool, for example. Some collectors may wish to preserve some of the past for future generations, others fall under the spell of the beauty of some antique tools.

Collecting categories 
Categories of tools range from the broad planes, rules, braces, hammers, etc. to the specific planes made by the Gage Company of Vineland, New Jersey, for example. People who are new to the hobby should know that there are many good modern reference books that will guide you in your search, as well as many reprints of the catalogs in which these tools were originally offered. Often tools will exhibit differences contrasting the different locations of their makers, or different features contrasting different time periods.

The following are some ways people collect tools: 
 Tools of a specific company or maker for example, L. Bailey Victor tools, Seneca Falls Tool Company tools, Miller's Falls tools, Disston Saws, Chelor planes, 1940s Skilsaw model 77, etc.
 Tools of a specific type hammers, braces, axes, saws, patented planes, transitional planes, treadle-powered machines, etc. 
 Tools of a specific period tools from 1850 to 1900, post-World War II era tools, etc. 
 Tools from a specific place Scottish tools, tools from Massachusetts makers, etc. 
 Tools of a specific occupation cooper's tools, machinist tools, watchmaker's tools, garden tools. 
 A combination of one or more of the above categories — for example, one each of a specific type of Stanley tool, i.e. all Stanley saws, all Stanley marking gauges, all Stanley planes, etc.
 A "type study" of one specific model, for example, a type study of Stanley #6 jointer planes or Norris A5 smooth planes.
 Tools that show how a specific idea progressed over time, for example tools tracing the development of the plane's adjusting mechanisms, or tools showing how an early patent was bought out and developed by another company. 
 Tool advertising and catalogs.

Sickles and scythes 
The American history of hay cutting tools begins with the reaping hook.  Its slender, ultra sharp, half circle blade was employed in cutting grass for hay and it took some skill to use successfully.  By the late 1800s the less artful sickle became the hay cutting tool of choice.  The blade of the sickle was serrated and less circular than the reaping hook.  The employment of this tool took less finesse and more of a slashing technique.  It was used in conjunction with a wooden grass crook with which one held the standing grass steady, while swinging the sickle blade through the shank.  Sickles found today will seem to have smooth blades to the modern viewer, as the serrations are usually worn away over time.

Scythes are grass cutting tools with long handles for mowing large amounts of hay. The graceful shape of the scythes of the late 18th and early 19th centuries hinted at the grace and art required for using the tool properly.  The blade was straighter than the sickle's, with an almost straight blade side and a gently curved blunt side.  The handle, called a snath, would ordinarily be of a hardwood indigenous to the area of manufacture with small handholds, strategically placed, termed nibs.  The earliest scythes had no nibs.  Later scythes had two nibs.  Used by an experienced hand, the scythe was an efficient tool, slicing through acres of green hay with methodic precision.  Scythes were the prized possession of early Americans and, carefully protected from abuse and weather, they could last for centuries.

List of manufacturers
Holtzapffel, English producer of lathes as well as edge and boring tools, London
Alexander Mathieson & Sons, Scottish manufacturer of edge tools, Glasgow
T. Norris & Son, English maker of fine planes, London
Edward Preston & Sons, English maker of wooden and iron woodworking tools, Birmingham, 1825 to 1932
Stanley, American producer of tools
Stewart Spiers, Scottish maker of fine planes, Ayr

List of collectors
 Ken Hawley
 Henry Chapman Mercer
 David R. Russell
 Raphael Salaman
 Eric Sloane

See also
Antique Woodworking Tools (book)

Further reading
 Adamson, John, "Vintage tools: gathering ideas for a collection", Furniture & Cabinetmaking, issue 257, May 2017,  pp. 58–61
 Boucard, Daniel (2006), Dictionnaire des outils. Paris: Jean-Cyrille Godefoy Éditions  
 Cartier, Claudine, Antique tools and instruments from the Nessi Collection, Milan: 5 Continents, 2004   
 Dunbar, Michael (1979), Antique Woodworking Tools: A Guide to the Purchase, Restoration and Use of Old Tools for Today's Shop. London: Stobart & Son  
 Gaynor, James M. & Hagedorn, Nancy L. (1993), Tools: Working Wood in Eighteenth-Century America. Williamsburg: Colonial Williamsburg Foundation  
 Goodman, W. L. (1978, first edn 1964), The History of Woodworking Tools. London: G. Bell and Sons Ltd 
 Goodman, W. L. (third edn 1993 revised by J & M Rees), British Planemakers from 1700. Needham Market: Roy Arnold 
 Greene-Plumb, Jonathan (2012), Early European Decorated Tools from the woodworking and allied trades. Ammanford: Stobart-Davies  
 Heine, Günther  (1990). Das Werkzeug des Schreiners und Drechslers. Hanover: Verlag Th. Schäfer  
 Nagyszalanczy, Sandor (1998), The Art of Fine Tools. Newtown, CT: Taunton Press  
 Russell, David R. with photography by James Austin and foreword by David Linley (2010). Antique Woodworking Tools: Their Craftsmanship from the Earliest Times to the Twentieth Century  Cambridge: John Adamson  
 Salaman, R.A. (1996). Dictionary of Leather-working Tools, c. 1700–1950, and the Tools of Allied Trades Mendham, NJ: Astragal Press 
 Salaman, R.A. (1997 ed. revised by Philip Walker) Dictionary of Woodworking Tools c. 1700–1970 and Tools of Allied Trades.  Mendham: Astragal Press 
 Sloane, Eric (1974 ed.). A Museum of Early American Tools.  New York: Ballantine Books (1974 ed.)

External links

Museums
 Deutsches Werkzeugmuseum, Remscheid
 DeWitt Wallace Museum, Colonial Williamsburg, Virginia
 Eric Sloane Museum & Kent Iron Furnace, Kent, Connecticut
 Hawley Collection, Kelham Island Museum, Sheffield
 Mercer Museum, Doylestown, Pennsylvania
 Maison de l’Outil et de la Pensée Ouvrière, Troyes, France
 Museum voor de Oudere Technieken, Grimbergen, Belgium
 Takenaka Carpentry Tools Museum, Kobe, Japan

Pictorial collections
Catalogue of American Patented Antique Tools. A pictorial collection of interesting hand tools
Key to the Manufactories of Sheffield, Sheffield: Joseph Smith, 1816. Pictorial guide to tool-making in Sheffield

Associations

Australia
Hand Tool Preservation Association of Australia Inc

Netherlands
 Ambachten & Gereedschap

United Kingdom
Tools and Trades History Society

United States
Early American Industries Association
Mid-West Tool Collectors Association

Auctioneers
Brown Tool Auctions, Watervliet, MI 49098, USA 
David Stanley Auctions, Osgathorpe, Leicestershire, LE12 9SR, England
Tennants Auctioneers, Leyburn, North Yorkshire, DL8 5SG, England. A department specializes in scientific instruments, cameras and tools
Tony Murland's antique tool auction house, Rendlesham, Suffolk, IP12 2TZ, England. Catalogues emphasize artistic aspects of tools

Dealers
Old Hand Tools and Collectables, Grantham, Lincolnshire, NG31 9HZ, England
Union Hill Antique Tools, USA. A site with introductory articles for tool collectors, and antique tools for sale
Tooltique, Antique & Vintage tools, Norwich, England. Dealers in antique and vintage tools, first established in 1977

Reviews and catalogues
 Find My Tool, UK. Reviews antique and vintage as well as new tools
 Old Tool Reprint Room. Lists reprints of old tool catalogues

Notes

Tools
Antiques
Industrial history